John Philip Cohane, born in New Haven, Connecticut was an American author. He later moved to Ireland where he wrote books on etymology and ancient astronaut themes.

Books

Cohane published The Indestructible Irish in 1968 in which he proposed that the Irish peoples were of 'Mediterranean origin’. In the book he claimed that the original blood stock in England, Ireland, Scotland, and Wales is Semitic. Cohane also published The Key: A Startling Enquiry into the Riddle of Mans Past, which claimed that before Egyptian, Greek, Phoenician and Carthaginian eras two major worldwide Semitic migrations took place from the Mediterranean and scattered across the earth.

The American linguist Cyrus Herzl Gordon was a friend of Cohane and wrote a preface to Cohane's book The Key, Gordon was supportive of many of Cohane's theories.

Cohane claimed that geographical names in America have a Semitic origin. He also believed that six word roots are found in most place names of most languages. Another claim by Cohane was that the Phoenicians adopted the alphabet from a prior Semitic culture.

In 1977 Cohane published Paradox: The Case for the Extraterrestrial Origin of Man in which he claimed man is a product of interplanetary colonization (see ancient astronauts).

Reception

Cohane's controversial ideas were rejected by professional archaeologists and historians as "fantasy" and "pseudoscience".

Archaeologist Phil C. Weigand described The Key as a "fantasy masked as science" and suggested that the linguistic analysis is "methodologically unsound to be ever seriously considered."

Bibliography

 1968 The Indestructible Irish
 1969 The Key: A Startling Enquiry into the Riddle of Mans Past
 1972 White Papers of an Outraged Conservative
 1977 Paradox: The Case for the Extraterrestrial Origin of Man

See also

 Tertius Chandler
 Hugh Fox
 Theory of Phoenician discovery of the Americas

References

Ancient astronauts proponents
Writers from New Haven, Connecticut
Pseudoarchaeologists
Pseudohistorians